Craig-y-Nos may refer to:
Craig-y-Nos Castle, a country house in Powys
Craig-y-Nos School, and independent primary school near Bishopston, Swansea